The Art of the Theremin is the first official album by theremin virtuoso Clara Rockmore, and the only one released in her lifetime.  It was produced by Robert Moog and his first wife, Shirleigh Moog, and was released as an LP in 1977 by Delos International Records.  As with most of her live performances, she was accompanied by her older sister, Nadia Reisenberg, on piano. The 1977 Delos LP and 1981 Japanese Delos LP release were entitled Theremin. The 1987 Delos CD was titled The Art of the Theremin.

Track listing

Personnel
 Clara Rockmore – theremin
 Nadia Reisenberg – piano
 Robert Moog, Shirleigh Moog – producers
 Michael Colina – audio engineer

References

1977 albums
Theremins